The 2015 Louisiana Attorney General election took place on October 24, 2015 to elect the Attorney General of the state of Louisiana, with a runoff election, held on November 21, 2015. Incumbent Buddy Caldwell, a former Democrat who joined the Republican Party in February 2011, sought re-election to a third term in office, but was defeated by Republican Jeff Landry.

Under Louisiana's jungle primary system, all candidates will appear on the same ballot, regardless of party, and voters may vote for any candidate, regardless of their party affiliation. Since no candidate received a majority of the vote during the primary election, a runoff election was held on November 21, 2015 between Caldwell and Landry. Louisiana is the only state that has a jungle primary system (California and Washington have a similar "top two primary" system).

Candidates

Republican party

Filed
 Buddy Caldwell, incumbent attorney general
 Jeff Landry, former U.S. Representative
 Martin Maley, 18th Judicial District assistant attorney

Declined
 John Neely Kennedy, state treasurer and Democratic candidate for Attorney General in 1991 (running for re-election)
 Burton Guidry, former assistant attorney general

Democratic party

Filed
 Geraldine Broussard Baloney
 Isaac Jackson

Declined
 Rick Gallot, state senator
 Walt Leger III, Speaker pro tempore of the Louisiana House of Representatives
 Jacques Roy, mayor of Alexandria

Jungle primary

Polling

 * Internal poll for the John Kennedy campaign

Results

Runoff

Results

References

External links
Buddy Caldwell for Attorney General
Jeff Landry for Attorney General
Marty Maley for Attorney General

Attorney General
Louisiana
Louisiana Attorney General elections